Niccolo Scolari (died 1200) was an Italian cardinal.

He was cardinal-nephew of Pope Clement III, his uncle, who elevated him in September 1190. In older historiography he is erroneously listed as Niccolo Boboni and nephew of Pope Celestine III. He subscribed papal bulls as S.R.E. diaconus cardinalis between October 23 and December 19, 1190, as cardinal-deacon of Santa Lucia in Orthea on February 17, 1191, and finally as cardinal-deacon of Santa Maria in Cosmedin between May 15, 1191 and August 4, 1200. He died before December 23, 1200.

References
 Maleczek, W., 1984: Papst und Kardinalskolleg von 1191 bis 1216, p. 97-98. Vienna

12th-century Italian cardinals
Cardinal-nephews
1200 deaths
Year of birth unknown